Graciano López y Jaena (December 18, 1856 – January 20, 1896), commonly known as Graciano López Jaena, was a Filipino journalist, orator, reformist, and national hero who is well known for his newspaper, La Solidaridad.

Philippine historians regard López Jaena, along with Marcelo H. del Pilar and José Rizal, as the triumvirate of Filipino propagandists. Of these three ilustrados, López Jaena was the first to arrive in Spain and may have begun the Propaganda Movement, which advocated the reform of the then-Spanish colony of the Philippines and which eventually led to the armed Philippine Revolution that begun in Manila in 1896. The Propaganda Movement was a key step towards a Philippine national identity.

Biography
Graciano López Jaena was born in Jaro, Iloilo, in the Captaincy General of the Philippines in the Spanish Empire on December 18, 1856. His parents were Plácido López and María Jacoba Jaena. He was baptized as "Graciano López y Jaena" on December 20, 1856, at Jaro Church by Plácido de Isana, and his godfather was Rufino Justiniano. Feeling that the priesthood was the most noble profession, his mother sent him to study at the St. Vincent Ferrer Seminary in Jaro. While there, he served as a secretary to his uncle, Claudio López, who was the honorary vice consul of Portugal in Iloilo.

Despite his mother wanting him to become a priest, López's true ambition was to become a physician. After convincing his parents, he sought enrollment at the University of Santo Tomas but was denied admission because the required Bachelor of Arts degree was not offered at the seminary in Jaro. Instead, he was appointed to the San Juan de Dios Hospital as an apprentice. Due to financial problems, he dropped out and returned to Iloilo to practice medicine.

During this period, his visits with the poor began to stir feelings about the injustices that were common. At the age of 18 he wrote the satirical story Fray Botod, which depicted a fat and lecherous friar. Botod’s false piety "always had the Virgin and God on his lips no matter how unjust and underhanded his acts are." This incurred the fury of the friars. Although the story was not published, a copy circulated in Iloilo but the friars could not prove that López was the author.

He got into trouble for refusing to testify that certain prisoners died of natural causes when it was obvious that they had died at the hands of the mayor of Pototan. López continued to agitate for justice and finally went to Spain when threats were made on his life. López sailed for Spain in 1880. There he became a leading writer and speaker for Philippine reform. By this time, he attached his maternal surname permanently to his paternal one, becoming "López Jaena", in order to stick out from the many Lopezes. (If he had not done this, by modern Philippine naming conventions his name would now be interpreted as "Graciano Jaena Lopez" or "Graciano J. Lopez".)

López Jaena pursued his medical studies at the University of Valencia but did not finish. Once Rizal reproached Lopéz Jaena for not finishing his medical studies. Graciano replied, "On the shoulders of slaves should not rest a doctor's cape." Rizal countermanded, "The shoulders do not honor the doctor's cape, but the doctor's cape honors the shoulders."

He then moved to the field of journalism. Losing interest in politics and academic life, he soon enjoyed his life in Barcelona and Madrid. However, his friends forgave him these indiscretions due to his talent with words. Mariano Ponce who was another of the Filipino propagandists in Spain observed, "... a deafening ovation followed the close of the peroration, the ladies waved their kerchiefs wildly, and the men applauded frantically as they stood up from their seats in order to embrace the speaker."
Rizal noted, "His great love is politics and literature. I do not know for sure whether he loves politics in order to deliver speeches or he loves literature to be a politician."

In addition he is remembered by the Filipino people for his literary contributions to the propaganda movement. López Jaena founded the fortnightly newspaper, La Solidaridad. When the publication office moved from Barcelona to Madrid, the editorship was succeeded to Marcelo H. del Pilar. His talent can be seen in the publication Discursos y Artículos Varios (Speeches and Various Articles).

López Jaena died of tuberculosis on January 20, 1896, in Barcelona, 11 months short of his 40th birthday. The following day, he was buried in a mass grave at the Montjuïc Cemetery of Barcelona. He died in poverty and his remains have not been brought back to the Philippines.

Public Holiday

December 18, Lopez Jaena's birthday, is a public holiday every year in Iloilo province and Iloilo City.

Legacy

In his honor, the Jaro Plaza was renamed the Graciano López Jaena Park, where there is also a statue of him.

The Graciano Lopez Jaena Foundation Inc works to continue his legacy and supports various public recognition of his life and works, such as the Dr. Graciano Lopez Jaena Poetry Contest.

The municipality of Lopez Jaena in Misamis Occidental is named after him.

An Order of DeMolay Chapter, a youth fraternal group for young men originating in freemasonry, was founded around 1965 in Jaro, and named Graciano Lopez-Jaena Chapter because Lopez Jaena was the first and foremost Freemason from Jaro.

Numerous streets throughout the Philippines are named after him in his honor.

Notable works
Fray Botod (Big-Bellied Friar)
La Hija del Fraile (The Daughter of a Friar)
Esperanzas (Hope)

In popular culture
 Portrayed by Ricardo Cepeda in 1996 TV Series Bayani, in episode Graciano López-Jaena: Fray Botod (1874)

References

Bibliography

External links

 Chapter History of the Graciano Lopez Jaena, Order of DeMolay

1856 births
1896 deaths
19th-century deaths from tuberculosis
Filipino journalists
Tuberculosis deaths in Spain
People of the Philippine Revolution
People from Iloilo City
Filipino Freemasons
Spanish-language writers of the Philippines
Filipino expatriates in Spain
19th-century journalists
Male journalists
19th-century male writers
University of Valencia alumni
Visayan people
Filipino newspaper editors
Filipino propagandists